Wallace Chung Hon-leung (born 30 November 1974) is a Hong Kong actor and singer, best known for his work on several Chinese television dramas.

Chung ranked 68th on Forbes China Celebrity 100 list in 2013, 94th in 2014, 45th in 2015, 31st in 2017.

Career

1993–1998: Beginnings and Rise to fame
His debut was in the 1993 Hong Kong TVB biographical television drama The Chord to Victory, portraying Kenny Bee, a member of The Wynners, after joining the network as a dancer. He rejected the offer to sign a 5-year contract due to the length of the contract and eventually left. In 1995, Chung moved to Taiwan to pursue a singing career under the guidance of record producer Samuel Tai, subsequently signing a contract with Music Impact.

Chung's successful debut with his 1995 dance album OREA dubbed him as Taiwan's "Little Sun." The eponymous title song quickly raced to No. 1, topping the charts for many weeks. In December 1995, Chung released his second album, By Your Side, which earned him a title as Taiwan's Best Idol for two years in the row. Chung achieved further fame in mainland China through the television series Imminent Crisis, making him the only actor from Hong Kong to be nominated at the China TV Golden Eagle Award. He gained mainstream popularity in 2015 with the hit romance drama My Sunshine, and won the Asia Grand Star Award at the Seoul International Drama Awards.

In 1995, Chung was recommended by Taiwanese music producers, and signed on with the record company Music Impact. That July, he debuted as a singer with his first solo album, OREA. The eponymous title song quickly raced to No. 1, topping the charts for many weeks. In December, he released his second album, By Your Side. With his successful debut and entry into the entertainment industry, the Taiwanese media dubbed him as Taiwan's "Little Sun".

In July 1996, he made his film debut in Hi Sir. Chung also contributed to the soundtrack of the film, singing the theme song "Ai Bu Shi Shou". Hi Sir topped box office charts and became the biggest summer hit of 1996. In October, he released his first Cantonese album titled Present, officially embarking onto the Hong Kong music industry.

In October 1998, Chung released his sixth album, Hello, How Are You. The title song "Subway" was nominated at the Golden Melody Awards for Best Composition. Chung also received praise for penning the lyrics to most of his songs, including "Really Like Me", "Us" and "I Really Want to Know".

1999–2009: Focus on acting
From 1999 onwards, Chung moved to the Mainland to focus on his acting career. The same year, he played his first television leading role in wuxia drama Windstorm.
In 2001, Chung had a guest role in the pan-Asia hit drama Meteor Garden.

Chung resumed his singing career in 2004. He published his seventh Mandarin-language album, Soul Man. The album received positive reviews from music critics.

Chung first gained recognition for his portrayal of two Qing-dynasty figures. In 2006, Chung starred in Secret History of Kangxi, portraying a famous Chinese poet Nalan Xingde. In 2008, Chung starred in Royal Tramp, portraying Kangxi Emperor.

In 2009, Chung starred in King of Shanghai. He was nominated for the Most Popular Actor award at the Shanghai Television Festival.

2011–2014: Rising popularity
In 2010, Chung starred in the romance melodrama Too Late to Say Loving You, portraying Mu Rongfeng. The drama earned a cult following among Mainland audiences, and Chung gained popularity in the Chinese mainland, especially among female audiences.

In January 2010, Chung released his eleventh Mandarin album, All Eyes On Me. Upon its release in mainland China in October, the album topped the charts and Chung won the Best Male Stage Performance at the Beijing Pop Music Awards. Chung once again won the award in 2011, with his single "One Day We Will Grow Old". The song was also named as one of the Top 10 songs of the year. In October 2011, he held his first solo concert titled "Wallace S-Party Concert" at Shanghai's Luwan Gymnasium.

In 2012, he starred in the spy drama Imminent Crisis. Chung's performance earned him acclaim, and he was nominated the Audience's Favorite TV Drama Actor in the Hong Kong and Taiwan region at the 26th China TV Golden Eagle Award and the Most Popular Actor at the 9th China Golden Eagle TV Art Festival. He won the Audience's Favorite TV Drama Actor in the Hong Kong and Taiwan region, becoming the first actor from Hong Kong and Taiwan region to win such a national TV award.

Chung was once again nominated for the award the subsequent year with his performance in the wuxia drama The Magic Blade (2012), adapted from Gu Long's novel of the same title. Chung was also awarded the Best Actor award at the 3rd LeTV awards for his performance.
 
In 2013, Chung starred in the romance drama Best Time, based on Tong Hua's novel The Most Beautiful Time. The series was a ratings hit, leading to increased popularity for Chung. Chung was awarded the Best Actor award for the Hong Kong and Taiwan region at the 4th LeTV awards. The same year, he starred in the wuxia drama The Demi-Gods and Semi-Devils, adapted from Louis Cha's novel Demi-Gods and Semi-Devils. He then starred in crime thriller film Drug War, directed by Johnnie To.

In 2014, Chung played dual roles in the drama The Stand-In, adapted from the film Bodyguards and Assassins. The series was nominated for the Outstanding Television Series award at the Flying Apsaras Awards. He also starred alongside Feng Shaofeng and Chen Bolin in the road trip comedy film The Continent, directed by Han Han.

2015–present: Mainstream popularity
In 2015, Chung starred in the romance melodrama in My Sunshine, based on the novel Silent Separation written by Gu Man. The series was a major hit, and propelled Chung to mainstream popularity in China. Chung received the Asia Star Grand Award at the 2015 Seoul International Drama Awards. The same year, he announced his directorial debut, Sandglass, a youth movie adapted from best-selling author Rao Xueman's book by the same name.
 
In December 2015, Chung released a new album titled Sing For Life, and announced his Sing For Life World Tour. The tour began in Shanghai on 20 February 2016, and subsequently traveled to Guangzhou, Shenzhen and Beijing.

In 2016, Chung starred in the action comedy film  Bounty Hunters, directed by Shin Terra, alongside Tiffany Tang and Korean actor Lee Min-ho. The same year, he starred in the crime thriller Tik Tok.
Chung then played the antagonist in crime drama film Three, which also stars Zhao Wei and Louis Koo. He won the Most Anticipated Actor award at the 19th China Movie Channel Media Award.

In 2017, Chung starred in the historical romance drama General and I, adapted from the novel A Lonesome Fragrance Waiting to be Appreciated, alongside Angelababy.

In 2018, Chung starred in the modern romance drama Memories of Love alongside Jiang Shuying, and romance melodrama All Out of Love with Sun Yi and Ma Tianyu.

In 2019, Chung was cast in the war film Liberation directed by Li Shaohong， and romance film Adoring.

In 2020, Chung starred in historical romance drama The Sword and the Brocade alongside actress Tan Songyun.

In 2022, Chung starred in the modern romance drama Because of Love alongside Li Xiaoran.

Filmography

Film

Television series

Variety show

Discography

Albums

Singles

Awards and nominations

Film and television

Music

References

External links
 
 
 
 

1974 births
Living people
Hong Kong people of Hakka descent
People from Huiyang
Cantopop singers
Hong Kong Mandopop singers
Chinese male dancers
Hong Kong male film actors
Hong Kong male television actors
20th-century Hong Kong male actors
21st-century Hong Kong male actors
Hakka musicians
Hong Kong idols
21st-century Hong Kong male singers
The Amazing Race contestants
Reality show winners